Alessio Deledda (born 10 December 1994) is an Italian racing driver. He currently competes in the Deutsche Tourenwagen Masters and previously competed in the Formula 2 Championship for HWA Racelab.

Early career

Beginnings 
Deledda was born in Genzano di Roma. He did not start in karting like most racing drivers. Among other things, he participated in the Italian Superstock 600 motorcycle championship in 2017. After little success, he switched to auto racing in 2018 and made his Formula 4 debut in the Italian F4 Championship, racing for Technorace, an Italian team dedicated to bringing drivers up the junior ranks.  

Deledda struggled through his debut season and scored no points. With 17th place at Autodromo Nazionale Monza as his best result, he finished in 39th place in the championship, and only 16th among the rookie drivers.

FIA Formula 3 Championship

2019 
In 2019, Deledda started the season in the winter championship of the Euroformula Open Championship, where he drove for Campos Racing. The two-races took place solely at Circuit Paul Ricard, and Deledda finished the races in eighth and ninth place. Subsequently, he made the switch to the new FIA Formula 3 Championship, in which he also drove for Campos. Deledda had a rough debut Formula 3 season, and finished 29th.

2020 
Despite this, he was retained for the 2020 F3 season, and partnered 2019 teammates Alex Peroni and German Sophia Flörsch. By the conclusion of his second season in Formula 3, his best finish had been 16th place, while all of his other finishes across several dozen races had been 20th or lower.

FIA Formula 2 Championship 

On January 22, 2021, Deledda was announced to be signing for HWA Racelab in Formula 2, partnering fellow countryman Matteo Nannini.

At the second round of the season in Monaco, Deledda qualified 6.8 seconds slower than polesitter Théo Pourchaire, which was outside of the 107% rule. Despite this, he was given permission to start the races from 22nd and last place on the grid. He finished the season 25th in the driver's championship standings, with no points scored.

Sportscar career

2022: Switch to DTM 
For the 2022 season, Deledda left single-seaters to join the Deutsche Tourenwagen Masters, driving a Lamborghini Huracán GT3 Evo for Grasser Racing. He scored his only point of the campaign during the final race at Hockenheim and finished 26th in the standings.

2023: Daytona debut 
The Italian took part in the 24 Hours of Daytona at the start of 2023, competing for NTE Sport in the GTD category.

His main campaign would once again lie in the DTM, where Deledda teamed up with Mirko Bortolotti and Franck Perera at SSR Performance.

Controversy 
On 26 November 2020, Deledda caused a stir after publishing several videos on his Instagram profile of himself driving recklessly and with high speed on an Italian motorway near Pomezia, Lazio. In one of the videos he slalomed around many cars during a traffic jam, and in another video he filmed the dashboard of his own car reaching 300 km/h in the process. A third video showed a Point-of-view shot driving a Lamborghini Urus on a public road, reaching again around 200 km/h while driving with one arm on the steering wheel. Deledda was criticized by former F1 driver Giedo van der Garde, along with a handful of other notable F1 personalities.

Deledda posted a statement in Italian on his Twitter on November 27 saying that he's sorry they associated the video with his name and that his intent was and will always be to "raise awareness" among his followers about "similar acts of villainy". He went onto say that his mistake was "probably not to specify that it was an act of complaint".

Racing record

Career summary

* Season still in progress.

Complete Italian F4 Championship results
(key) (Races in bold indicate pole position; races in italics indicate fastest lap)

Complete Formula Renault Eurocup results
(key) (Races in bold indicate pole position; races in italics indicate fastest lap)

Complete FIA Formula 3 Championship results
(key) (Races in bold indicate pole position; races in italics indicate points for the fastest lap of top ten finishers)

Complete Macau Grand Prix results

Complete F3 Asian Championship results
(key) (Races in bold indicate pole position; races in italics indicate fastest lap)

† Driver did not finish the race, but was classified as they completed over 75% of the race distance.

Complete FIA Formula 2 Championship results 
(key) (Races in bold indicate pole position; races in italics indicate points for the fastest lap of top ten finishers)

Complete Deutsche Tourenwagen Masters results
(key) (Races in bold indicate pole position) (Races in italics indicate fastest lap)

Complete IMSA SportsCar Championship results
(key) (Races in bold indicate pole position; races in italics indicate fastest lap)

References

External links
 

1994 births
Living people
Italian racing drivers
Italian F4 Championship drivers
FIA Formula 3 Championship drivers
F3 Asian Championship drivers
FIA Formula 2 Championship drivers
People from Imola
Campos Racing drivers
Hitech Grand Prix drivers
HWA Team drivers
Sportspeople from the Metropolitan City of Bologna
Deutsche Tourenwagen Masters drivers
Formula Renault Eurocup drivers
Pinnacle Motorsport drivers
Euronova Racing drivers
WeatherTech SportsCar Championship drivers
Lamborghini Super Trofeo drivers